"Can We Fix It?" is the name of the theme song from the British preschool animated television programme Bob the Builder. It was written by Paul K. Joyce and produced by Hot Animation. The song's title is derived from the catchphrase of the programme's titular character, and the chorus of the song features this phrase prominently, as well as the response, "Yes we can!" Vocals on the song are provided by Neil Morrissey, who voiced Bob at the time of the track's recording. It was released as a single on 4 December 2000 in the United Kingdom.

"Can We Fix It?" became the UK Christmas number-one single of 2000, beating Westlife's "What Makes a Man" to the top spot. It was the biggest-selling single of the year in the United Kingdom, appearing 10th on the decade-end chart and 80th on the all-time UK best-sellers list. The song has sold over one million copies in the United Kingdom according to the Official Charts Company. On 13 August 2001, the song was released in Australia and reached number one that September, becoming the ninth-best-selling single of the year there.

A second single by Bob the Builder, "Mambo No. 5", with the lyrics adapted from Lou Bega's 1999 hit version, also reached number one on the UK chart in September 2001. An album entitled The Album followed, which debuted at number four on the UK Albums Chart.

Critical reception
The song was rated 8/10 by Stylus Magazine, saying "kids TV themes getting to number one is a thing to be savoured, especially when a), it stops pretentious tosh like "Stan" from reigning at the top of the charts and b), when it actually has a much better 2-step beat than any of the garage number ones from the previous 18 months."

Track listings

UK and Australian CD single
 "Can We Fix It?"
 "Bob's Line Dance"
 "Can We Fix It?" (karaoke version)
 "Can We Fix It?" (video)

UK cassette single
 "Can We Fix It?"
 "Bob's Line Dance"

Personnel
Personnel are adapted from the UK cassette single sleeve.
 Paul K. Joyce – writing
 Neil Morrissey – vocals
 Grant Mitchell – production, arrangement
 Graham Dickson – mixing, engineering

Charts

Weekly charts

Year-end charts

Decade-end charts

Certifications

Release history

References

2000 songs
2000 debut singles
BBC Records singles
Bob the Builder songs
Christmas number-one singles in the United Kingdom
English children's songs
Number-one singles in Australia
Number-one singles in Scotland
Songs from animated series
Animated series theme songs
Children's television theme songs
UK Independent Singles Chart number-one singles
UK Singles Chart number-one singles
Universal Music Australia singles
Songs about occupations